Tommaso Cazzaniga (born 17 January 1998 in Giussano) is an Italian professional football player currently playing for GS Arconatese.

Honours

Club 
 Monza
Serie D: 2016-17

References

External links

1998 births
Living people
Italian footballers
Serie D players
Serie C players
A.C. Monza players
Association football midfielders
People from Brianza
S.C. Caronnese S.S.D. players
Footballers from Lombardy